John Phillips Jones (3 March 1886 – 19 March 1951) was a Welsh international centre who played club rugby for Pontypool Rugby Club and Newport Rugby Football Club. He won 14 caps for Wales and was known as The Prince of Centres.

Rugby career
John 'Jack' Phillip Jones was born in Pontymoile, Pontypool in 1886, to David Jones and his wife Margaret (née Phillips). Jones was one of four brothers, who would all eventually play for Pontypool Rugby Club. Two of his brother, David and James, would, like Jack, eventually play international rugby for Wales. The Joneses along with the Goulds are the only family to provide three brothers to the Welsh international rugby union team.

Jones was first capped, at centre, making his debut against Australia in December, 1908. He would play for Wales a further 13 times and would probably have been capped far more times but for the cessation of international rugby during the years of the First World War.

Jones would play in two British Isles tours. The first was part of Arthur Harding's 1908 tour of Australasia, the second was to South Africa in 1910.

International matches played for Wales
Wales
  1908
  1909, 1910, 1912, 1921
  1909, 1910, 1912, 1913, 1920
  1909, 1913, 1920
  1909

British Isles
  1908, 1908, 1908
  1910, 1910, 1910

Bibliography

References

1886 births
1951 deaths
Rugby union players from Pontypool
People educated at Christ College, Brecon
Welsh rugby union players
Wales international rugby union players
Rugby union centres
Wales rugby union captains
Newport RFC players
Barbarian F.C. players
British & Irish Lions rugby union players from Wales
Pontypool RFC players
Monmouthshire County RFC players